Anna-Lena Friedsam is the defending champion, but decided not to participate this year.

Zhang Kailin won the title, defeating Duan Yingying in an all-Chinese final, 1–6, 6–3, 6–4.

Seeds

Draw

Finals

Top half

Bottom half

References
Main Draw

Suzhou Ladies Open - Singles
2015 Singles